Biagiotti is an Italian surname. Notable people with the surname include:

Adriana Biagiotti (born 1947), Italian artistic gymnast
Laura Biagiotti (1943–2017), Italian fashion designer
Lisa Biagiotti (born 1979), filmmaker and journalist based in Los Angeles

Italian-language surnames